Kenneth Andre Ian Rodgers (December 2, 1934 – December 13, 2004) was a Major League Baseball shortstop who played for the New York / San Francisco Giants (1957–60), Chicago Cubs (1961–64), and Pittsburgh Pirates (1965–67). He also played one season in Nippon Professional Baseball(NPB) for the Taiyo Whales (1969).

Career

A native of Nassau, Bahamas, Rodgers was the first Bahamian to play in the major leagues. He was a talented cricket player who paid his own way for a tryout with the Giants in 1954. Rodgers failed to make the team that year. He had to learn the rules of baseball, not to jump away from curveballs, and consequently, he adjusted and made his debut in 1957. Rodgers was a part of the Giants roster until October 1960 when he was traded to the Milwaukee Braves for Alvin Dark, who ultimately became the San Francisco manager at the time.

Before the 1961 season started, the Braves traded Rodgers to the Cubs. In 1962, he became the regular Cubs shortstop when Ernie Banks moved to first base. In that season, Rodgers, second baseman Ken Hubbs and Banks set a league record for double plays. After four productive seasons for the Cubs, Rodgers was traded to the Pirates.

In an 11-year career, Rodgers compiled a .249 batting average with 45 home runs and 245 RBI in 854 games. But even more important than the success he accomplished in his career was the fact that he opened the door for countrymen to follow, such as Ed Armbrister, Tony Curry, Wenty Ford, and Wil Culmer. Indeed, in the immediate years following his success, baseball began to emerge as the most popular sport in the Bahamas, and, in the 1960s, had become even more popular than cricket.

Andre Rodgers died in Nassau at the age of 70.

External links

1934 births
2004 deaths
Bahamian expatriate baseball players in the United States
Chicago Cubs players
Columbus Jets players
Dallas Eagles players
Expatriate baseball players in Japan
Major League Baseball players from the Bahamas
Major League Baseball shortstops
Minneapolis Millers (baseball) players
New York Giants (NL) players
Olean Giants players
Phoenix Giants players
Pittsburgh Pirates players
St. Cloud Rox players
San Francisco Giants players
Sportspeople from Nassau, Bahamas
Taiyō Whales players
Bahamian expatriate sportspeople in Japan